Revenge of the Red Baron is a 1994 American comedy film starring Mickey Rooney, Tobey Maguire, Laraine Newman, Cliff De Young, produced by Roger Corman and directed by Robert Gordon.

Premise
The Red Baron returns in a toy plane to kill the former World War I flying ace that shot him down.

Reception
In 2005, Dread Central writer Jon Condit, as part of the site's column highlighting obscure films, panned the film and questioned the intention of producer Roger Corman, noting that it contained elements of horror, comedy and family films, but it does not consistently mix any of its genre elements:

References

External links

1994 films
1994 comedy films
American aviation films
American comedy films
Cultural depictions of Manfred von Richthofen
1990s English-language films
1990s American films